Rafael Gonçalves Toledo (born 24 January 1980 in Limeira), commonly known as Rafael Toledo, is a Brazilian retired footballer who played as a right back, and is the current assistant manager of Vila Nova.

Honours

Player
Atlético Paranaense
Campeonato Paranaense: 2005

Brasiliense
Campeonato Brasiliense: 2006

Manager
Brasiliense
Campeonato Brasiliense: 2017

References

External links
 CBF

1980 births
Living people
People from Limeira
Brazilian footballers
Brazilian football managers
Association football defenders
Campeonato Brasileiro Série A players
Campeonato Brasileiro Série B players
Grêmio Foot-Ball Porto Alegrense players
Rio Branco Esporte Clube players
Guarani FC players
Criciúma Esporte Clube players
Club Athletico Paranaense players
Clube Atlético Sorocaba players
Associação Portuguesa de Desportos players
Esporte Clube Bahia players
Brasiliense Futebol Clube players
Clube Atlético Juventus players
Santa Helena Esporte Clube players
Associação Atlética Luziânia players
Esporte Clube Juventude players
Brasiliense Futebol Clube managers
Vila Nova Futebol Clube managers
Footballers from São Paulo (state)